The PLDT High Speed Hitters (formerly the Smart Giga Hitters and the PLDT Home Fibr Power Hitters) is the professional women's volleyball team owned by PLDT.

History
The team debuted in 2018 as the Smart Prepaid Giga Hitters. The team was owned by Smart Communications.

For the 2018 PSL Invitational Cup, the team partnered with the Philippine Army Lady Troopers and competed as the Smart–Army Giga Hitters. 

In September 2018, the PayMaya High Flyers, their affiliate team in the Premier Volleyball League (PVL), was merged with the team. In February 2019, the Smart Prepaid Giga Hitters changed its name to the PLDT Home Fibr Power Hitters.

The team transferred to the PVL in February 2021, following the league's professionalization. The team changed their name to the High Speed Hitters in January 2022, in a lead up to the upcoming PVL season.

Names
 Smart Prepaid Giga Hitters (2018 Grand Prix)
 Smart–Army Giga Hitters (2018 Invitational)
 Smart Giga Hitters (2018 All-Filipino)
 PLDT Home Fibr Power Hitters (2019)
 PLDT Home Fibr Hitters (2020)
 PLDT Home Fibr Power Hitters (2021)
 PLDT High Speed Hitters (2022–)

Current roster 
For the 2023 Premier Volleyball League All-Filipino Conference:

Head coach
  Rald Ricafort 
Assistant coaches
  Clint Malazo
  Niel Fred Are
  Arnold Laniog 
| valign="top" |

Team manager
  Del Rosario / Nadal
Doctor
Physical Therapist
  Raymond Pili

 Team Captain
 Import
 Draft Pick
 Rookie
 Inactive
 Suspended
 Free Agent
 Injured

Previous roster

PLDT High Speed Hitters 
For the 2022 Premier Volleyball League Reinforced Conference:

Head coach
  George Pascua
Assistant coaches
  Clint Malazo
  Niel Fred Are
| valign="top" |

Team manager
  Del Rosario / Nadal
Doctor
Physical Therapist
  Raymond Pili

 Team Captain
 Import
 Draft Pick
 Rookie
 Inactive
 Suspended
 Free Agent
 Injured

For the 2022 Premier Volleyball League Invitational Conference:

Head coach
  George Pascua
Assistant coaches
  Clint Malazo
  Niel Fred Are
| valign="top" |

Team manager
  Del Rosario / Nadal
Doctor
Physical Therapist
  Raymond Pili

 Team Captain
 Import
 Draft Pick
 Rookie
 Inactive
 Suspended
 Free Agent
 Injured

For the 2022 Premier Volleyball League Open Conference:

Head coach
  George Pascua
Assistant coaches
  Clint Malazo
  Niel Fred Are
| valign="top" |

Team manager
  Del Rosario / Nadal
Doctor
Physical Therapist
  Raymond Pili

 Team Captain
 Import
 Draft Pick
 Rookie
 Inactive
 Suspended
 Free Agent
 Injured

PLDT Home Fibr Power Hitters 

For the 2021 Premier Volleyball League Open Conference

Head coach
 Roger Gorayeb
Assistant coaches
 Clint Malazo
 Niel Fred Are
| valign="top" |

Team manager
 Del Rosario / Nadal
Doctor
Physical Therapist
 Raymond Pili

PLDT Home Fibr

For the 2020 PSL Grand Prix Conference

Head coach
  Roger Gorayeb
Assistant coaches
  Clint Malazo
  Niel Fred Are
| valign="top" |

Team manager
  Del Rosario / Nadal
Doctor
  TBA
Physical Therapist
  Raymond Pili
Trainer
  

 Team Captain
 Import
 Draft Pick
 Rookie
 Inactive
 Suspended
 Free Agent
 Injured

For the 2019 PSL Grand Prix Conference

Head coach
  Roger Gorayeb
Assistant coaches
  Clint Malazo
  Niel Fred Are
| valign="top" |

Team manager
  Del Rosario / Nadal
Doctor
  TBA
Physical Therapist
  Raymond Pili
Trainer
  

 Team Captain
 Import
 Draft Pick
 Rookie
 Inactive
 Suspended
 Free Agent
 Injured

Smart Giga Hitters

For the 2018 PSL All-Filipino Conference

Head coach
  Roger Gorayeb
Assistant coaches
  Clint Malazo
  Niel Fred Are
| valign="top" |

Team manager
  
Doctor
  TBA
Physical Therapist
  Raymond Pili
Trainer
  

 Team Captain
 Import
 Draft Pick
 Rookie
 Inactive
 Suspended
 Free Agent
 Injured

For the 2018 PSL Invitational Cup

Head coach
  Emilio Reyes Jr.
Assistant coaches
  Patricia Torres
  Patrick John Rojas
| valign="top" |

Team manager
  Col. A. Divinagracia
Doctor
  TBA
Physical Therapist
  Delos Reyes
Trainer
  Tomas

 Team Captain
 Import
 Draft Pick
 Rookie
 Inactive
 Suspended
 Free Agent
 Injured

For the 2018 PSL Grand Prix Conference

Head coach
  Ronald Dulay
Assistant Coach(es)
  Zenaida Ybañez-Chavez
  D. Galvez
| valign="top" |

Team manager
  TBA
Doctor
  TBA
Physical Therapist
  TBA

 Team Captain
 Import
 Draft Pick
 Rookie
 Inactive
 Suspended
 Free Agent
 Injured

Honors

Team 
Premier Volleyball League:

Philippine Superliga:

Individual 
Premier Volleyball League:

Philippine Superliga:

Team captains 
  Janet Serafica (2018)
  Mary Jean Balse–Pabayo (2018)
  Aiko Sweet Urdas (2018)
  Gretchel Soltones (2019)
  Jerrili Malabanan (2019)
  Rysabelle Devanadera (2019-2020)
  Rhea Dimaculangan (2021-2022)
  Mika Aereen Reyes (2023 - present)

Coaches 
 Ronald Dulay (2018 Grand Prix)
 Emilio Reyes Jr. (2018 Invitational)
 Roger Gorayeb (2018–2021)
 George Pascua (2022)
 Rald Ricafort (2023-present)

Imports 
  Gyselle Silva (2018)
  Marija Jelic (2018)
  Grace Lazard (2019)
  Kendra Dahlke (2019)
  Maeva Orle (2020)
  Elena Savkina-Samoilenko (2022)

See also
 PLDT Home Fibr Hitters (men's team)

References 

Women's volleyball teams in the Philippines
Philippine Super Liga
2018 establishments in the Philippines
Volleyball clubs established in 2018
Premier Volleyball League (Philippines)